Veritas Enterprise Vault (EV) is an enterprise information archive platform developed by Veritas Technologies.  It is part of the company's "Information Governance" suite. Enterprise Vault has the ability to archive from various sources such as Microsoft Exchange (2016, 2013, 2010, 2007, 2003), SMTP (any), IBM Domino (latest release), Microsoft SharePoint and various File Systems (Windows NTFS and Linux/Unix file systems) with the ability to store on a multiple of storage platforms, such as NTFS, NetApp, Centera, SMB and WORM. The data archived is indexed, classified, de-duplicated and securely stored.

History
Enterprise Vault was originally developed at Digital Equipment Corporation (DEC) by a group of developers who had previously been the engineering team for Digital's VMS based ALL-IN-1 office and messaging system.  After DEC was acquired by Compaq Computer Corporation the Enterprise Vault team was terminated just after Version 1 of the product was shipped.

Technical Director Nigel Dutt approached Edward Forwood of broker Durlacher with a proposal to start a company to develop and sell the product.  They consequently acquired the rights to the product and formed kVault Software Limited in late 1999 with initial funding from Durlacher.  The  four years from 2000–2004 saw greatly improved sales and eventual acquisition by VERITAS Software in 2004. Veritas was subsequently acquired by Symantec in 2005 for $13.5B. However, on February 1, 2016, Symantec completed its sale of Veritas to the Carlyle group for $7.4B and Enterprise Vault again reverted to being a Veritas product.

Enterprise Vault was originally part of Symantec's "Enterprise Messaging Management" group (created after Symantec acquired VERITAS in 2005). Much of the original KVS Engineering team of Development and QA still work on Enterprise Vault, based in Reading (UK) and Pune (India).

As of June 2018 all Enterprise Vault engineers in the UK were made redundant.

Release timeline
Last updated 24 February 2022.

References

External links
 Official Product Page
 Enterprise Vault history 1997-2004

Symantec software
Computer archives